See also Bayer (surname) and buyer.

Beyer is mostly a German family name, occurring most commonly in German-speaking countries. It can be either habitational (derived from Bayer, which is the male German language demonym for Bavaria) or occupational (derived from the archaic German verb beiern, "to ring (a bell)", thus referring to individuals tasked with ringing church bells). Variants of the surname include Beier, Bayer and Baier.

Most inventions and institutions listed here with the name Beyer were named after an inventor or founder or supporter with the name Beyer.

People named Beyer
 Absalon Pederssøn Beyer (died 1575), Norwegian clergyman
 Adam Beyer (born 1976), Swedish techno producer and DJ
 Albert Beyer (1859–1929), United States Navy coxswain
 Alexander Beyer (born 1973), German actor
 Andrew Beyer, American expert on horse race betting who designed the Beyer Speed Figure
 Barbara Petzold-Beyer, former East German cross-country skier
 Bero Beyer, Dutch film producer
 Beyers Naudé (1915–2004), Afrikaner-South African cleric, theologian and anti-apartheid activist
 Brad Beyer (born 1973), American actor
 Brett Beyer (born 1966), international sailing coach
 Charles Beyer (1813–1876), British locomotive engineer
 Clara Beyers (1880–1950), actress
 Colin Beyer (1938–2015), New Zealandlawyer and businessman
 Dick Beyer (1930–2019), American retired professional wrestler best known as The Destroyer or Doctor X
 Don Beyer (born 1950), US Member of Congress, former Ambassador to Switzerland
 Eugen Beyer (1882–1940), 19th-century German army officer
 Ferdinand Beyer (1803–1863), German composer
 Frank Beyer (1932–2006), German film director
 Franz Beyer (musicologist) (1922–2018), German musicologist
 Friedrich Beyer (later Bayer) (1825-1880), German businessman and chemist, founder of Bayer AG
 Georgina Beyer (1957–2023), world's first openly transsexual Member of Parliament
 H. Otley Beyer (1883–1966), American anthropologist
 Jan Beyer Schmidt-Sørensen (born 1958), Danish economist and Director of Business Development at Aarhus Municipality
 Jinny Beyer (born 1941), American quilt designer and quilter
 Kirsten Beyer, American science fiction writer
 Lisa Beyer, United States journalist
 Mark Beyer (comics) (born 1950), comic artist
 Markus Beyer (1971-2018), German boxer
 Olaf Beyer (born 1957), Olympic champion
 Peter Beyer (born 1952), German Golden Rice Inventor
 Peter Beyer (politician) (born 1970), German politician
 Ralph Beyer (1921–2008), German letter-cutter and sculptor
 Richard Beyer (1925–2012), American sculptor
 Robert D. Beyer, American investor and executive
 Robert T. Beyer (1920–2008), American physicist
 Tanya Beyer, American model and actress
 Troy Beyer (born 1964), American film director and screenwriter and actress
 Udo Beyer (born 1955), former German track and field athlete who represented East Germany in the shot put
 Uwe Beyer (1945–1993), Olympic contestant
 William Gray Beyer, American science fiction and mystery writer

Companies and institutions named Beyer
 Beyerdynamic German audio equipment manufacturer
 The Doebner-Miller reaction, an organic chemical reaction
 Garratt, also type of steam locomotive that is articulated in three parts
 Beyer, Peacock & Company, a former train manufacturer in England
 The Beyer Speed Figure, a system for rating the performance of Thoroughbred racehorses
 The Beyer Stadium was in Illinois and was demolished in the early 1990s
 The Fred C. Beyer High School is in the Modesto City Schools District of Modesto, California.
 The Beyer Professor of Applied Mathematics, an endowed professorial position at the University of Manchester

German-language surnames
German toponymic surnames
Ethnonymic surnames